Winter's Night is a 2018 South Korean drama film, written, directed and edited by Jang Woo-jin. It premiered at the 2018 Jeonju International Film Festival.

Plot
Middle-aged couple, Eun-joo (Seo Young-hwa) and Heung-joo (Yang Heung-joo), takes a trip to Chuncheon in 30 years. After visiting Cheongpyeong Temple on an island, they are forced to return to the island when Eun-joo realizes she has left her phone behind. They retrace their footsteps and meet a young couple (Lee Sang-hee and Woo Ji-hyun) who reminder them of their younger self. As the night wears on, it soon reveals all is not well between Eun-joo and Heung-joo and their relationship is in crisis.

Cast
 Seo Young-hwa as Eun-joo 
 Yang Heung-joo as Heung-joo
 Lee Sang-hee as soldier's girlfriend
 Woo Ji-hyun as soldier
 Kim Hak-sun as Taxi driver

Reception

Critical response
On the review aggregation website Rotten Tomatoes, the film holds an approval rating of  based on  reviews.

Awards and nominations

References

External links
 
 
 

2018 films
2010s Korean-language films
South Korean drama films
2010s South Korean films